Lawrence William Gilbert (December 3, 1891 – February 17, 1965) was an American right fielder in Major League Baseball and a longtime manager in minor league baseball. A native of New Orleans, Louisiana, who broke into baseball as a left-handed pitcher, Gilbert first became famous as a member of the 1914 "Miracle" Boston Braves.

But his Major League career lasted only two seasons (the Braves' breakthrough 1914 campaign and 1915). A left-handed batter, he batted .230 with five homers, 29 runs batted in, ten doubles and seven stolen bases. In , Gilbert was a member of the Braves team that went from last place to first in two months, becoming the first team to win a pennant after being in last place on the Fourth of July. The team then went on to defeat Connie Mack's heavily favored Philadelphia Athletics in the 1914 World Series. In the series, he drew an intentional walk in his only appearance.

Gilbert became more famous as a minor league manager in the Southern Association, where he led teams for 25 seasons, including the New Orleans Pelicans from 1923–31 and 1933–38 and the Nashville Vols from 1939–48. He took 1932 off from his dugout duties to serve as president of the Pelicans, then was a part-owner of the Vols from 1939 through 1955. His managing career was bracketed by pennants. His New Orleans club posted 89 wins and a .610 winning percentage in 1923, and his final club, in Nashville, won 95 games but lost the 1948 playoff championship.

Gilbert won eight Southern Association championships during his quarter-century in the league, including six consecutive titles (1939–44) with the Vols. His clubs twice won 101 games (1926 with New Orleans and 1940 with Nashville). Gilbert's career record as a minor league skipper was 2,128 wins and 1,627 defeats (.567).

He died in New Orleans of undisclosed causes at age 73. He was the father of Charlie Gilbert, a National League outfielder from 1940–43 and in 1946–47, and Tookie Gilbert, a minor league slugger with the Vols who had two trials with the New York Giants in the early 1950s.

References

Obituary, The New York Times, February 18, 1965.
Johnson, Lloyd, ed., The Minor League Register. Durham, North Carolina: Baseball America, 1994.

External links

1891 births
1965 deaths
Baseball players from New Orleans
Battle Creek Crickets players
Boston Braves players
Kansas City Blues (baseball) players
Major League Baseball right fielders
Milwaukee Brewers (minor league) players
Minor league baseball executives
Minor league baseball managers
Nashville Vols managers
New Orleans Pelicans (baseball) players
San Antonio Bronchos players
Toronto Maple Leafs (International League) players
Victoria Rosebuds players
Jesuit High School (New Orleans) alumni